Pete Rodriguez may refer to:
 Pete Rodriguez (American football) (1940–2014), American football coach
 Pete "El Conde" Rodríguez (1932–2000), Puerto Rican salsa singer
 Pete Rodriguez (boogaloo musician) (born 1932), leader and pianist of a Puerto Rican boogaloo band
 Pete Rodriguez (jazz musician) (born 1969), jazz trumpeter and percussionist